Lakhan Ghanghoriya is an Indian politician who was minister of Social Justice, Disabled and Scheduled Castes Welfare Department of Madhya Pradesh from 2018 to 2020. He is Member of the legislative assembly from the Jabalpur East. He is member of legislative assembly. He represents the Jabalpur East constituency from where he has won twice.

Early life 
Lakhan Ghanghoriya completed his B.Sc. from Govt. College R.D.V.V University Jabalpur in 1983 and L.L.B from Hitkarini Law College R.D.University in 2001.

References 

1960 births
Living people
Indian National Congress politicians from Madhya Pradesh